John Douglas McKinnon, Jr. (July 15, 1899 — February 8, 1969) was a Canadian professional ice hockey defenceman who played six seasons in the National Hockey League for the Montreal Canadiens, Pittsburgh Pirates, and Philadelphia Quakers between 1925 and 1931. He then spent eight seasons in the American Hockey Association, and retired in 1938. He was born in Guysborough, Nova Scotia.

Career statistics

Regular season and playoffs

External links

1899 births
1969 deaths
Canadian ice hockey defencemen
Central Hockey League (1925–1926) players
Cleveland Hockey Club ice hockey players
Fort Pitt Hornets players
Ice hockey people from Nova Scotia
Kansas City Pla-Mors players
Minneapolis Millers (AHA) players
Montreal Canadiens players
People from Guysborough County, Nova Scotia
Philadelphia Quakers (NHL) players
Pittsburgh Pirates (NHL) players
St. Louis Flyers (AHA) players